Richard Irvine Manning I (May 1, 1789May 1, 1836) was the 50th Governor of South Carolina from 1824 to 1826 and was later a Representative in the United States Congress.

Early life and career
Manning was born in the Sumter District and he received his education at the local private schools. In 1811, he graduated from South Carolina College where he was a member of the Clariosophic Society. He served as a captain in the South Carolina militia during the War of 1812. After the war, he engaged in planting on Hickory Hill Plantation in Sumter County. It was there that his son and a future Governor of South Carolina, John Lawrence Manning, was born in 1816.

Political career
In 1820, Manning was elected to the South Carolina House of Representatives and served for one term. He successfully sought election to the South Carolina Senate and two years later in 1824, the General Assembly elected him as Governor of South Carolina. During his two-year term as governor, Manning advocated the reform of the Negro Laws by pushing for an end of execution by burning and to have capital cases tried by jury at a courthouse.

Upon leaving office in 1826, Manning remained active in politics and participated in the Union Party in opposition to the Nullifier Party. He made an unsuccessful run for Congress in 1826 and was also unsuccessful in his bid for another term as governor in 1830. However, Manning won a special election in 1834 as a Jacksonian to fill the seat of the 8th congressional district caused by the death of James Blair. He was re-elected in 1834, but he died in Philadelphia on May 1, 1836 (his 47th birthday) prior to the completion of the term. Manning was interred at the Trinity Episcopal churchyard in Columbia.

See also
List of United States Congress members who died in office (1790–1899)

References

External links
SCIway Biography of Richard Irvine Manning I
NGA Biography of Richard Irvine Manning I
United States Congress Biography of Richard Irvine Manning I

1789 births
1836 deaths
University of South Carolina alumni
Members of the South Carolina House of Representatives
South Carolina state senators
Governors of South Carolina
University of South Carolina trustees
South Carolina Democratic-Republicans
Jacksonian members of the United States House of Representatives from South Carolina
Democratic-Republican Party state governors of the United States
19th-century American politicians